Azerbaijan participated in the 2019 European Games held in Minsk from 21 to 30 June 2019. Azerbaijan were represented in 11 sports by a total of 82 competitors across the games.

Medalists

|width="30%" align=left valign=top|

Competitors 
Azerbaijan will be represented by 82 athletes in 11 sports.

Archery 

Azerbaijan won the only license for this type at the 2018 European Archery Championships in Legnica, Poland.

Badminton 

Men

Boxing 

Men

Women

Canoeing 

Women

Cycling

Road

Track 

Sprint

Keirin

Gymnastics

Acrobatic

Mixed pair

Artistic

Men

Women

Rhythmic

Individual

Group

Trampoline 

Men

Judo 

Men

Women

Mixed events

Karate 

Men

Individual kata

Women

Sambo 

Men

Women

Shooting 

Men

Women

Mixed team

Wrestling 

Men's Greco-Roman

Men's freestyle

Women's freestyle

References

Nations at the 2019 European Games
European Games
2019